Beautiful Mountain is part of the Chuska Mountains and its summit is the highest point in San Juan County, New Mexico. It is on the Navajo Nation and plays a significant role in Navajo mythology.

History
Navajo legend includes "Beautiful Mountain" as the feet of a large mythic male figure, with the Chuska Mountains comprising the body, Chuska Peak as the head and the Carrizo Mountains as the legs. Shiprock is said to be either a medicine pouch or a bow carried by the figure.

References

External links
 

Landforms of San Juan County, New Mexico
Landmarks in New Mexico
Mountains of New Mexico
Religious places of the indigenous peoples of North America
Mountains of San Juan County, New Mexico
Navajo Nation